Chaghcharan District  is one of the most populated districts in Ghor province (115,000 in 2005). It is a mountainous district. The winter is severe and the roads are inaccessible because of the snow. The district center of Chaghcharan is also the capital of the province. The drought has seriously affected agriculture — the main source of income. There are a hospital and secondary schools in the district center, but because of the bad roads and severe weather they are hardly accessible to the rural population.

See also 
 Chaghcharan
 Districts of Afghanistan

External links 
UNHCR Sub-Office, Herat, District Profile: Chaghcharan

Districts of Ghor Province